The 1932 Washington & Jefferson Presidents football team was an American football team that represented Washington & Jefferson College as an independent during the 1932 college football season. The team compiled a 5–3–1 record and outscored opponents by a total of 94 to 38. Hank Day was the head coach.

Schedule

References

Washington and Jefferson
Washington & Jefferson Presidents football seasons
Washington and Jefferson Presidents football